Eryngium spinosepalum,  known by the common names spinysepal eryngo and spiny-sepaled button celery, is an uncommon species of flowering plant in the family Apiaceae.

Distribution
The annual or perennial herb is endemic to California, where it is native to the eastern San Joaquin Valley (southern Central Valley) and adjacent lower Sierra Nevada foothills.

It is a plant of vernal pools, moist grasslands, swales, and similar wetland habitats.

Description

The heads bloom in white petals, during April and May.

References

External links
 Calflora Database: Eryngium spinosepalum (Spiny sepaled button celery,  Spinysepal eryngo)
Jepson eFlora (TJM2) treatment of Eryngium spinosepalum
USDA Plants Profile
UC CalPhotos gallery of Eryngium spinosepalum (spinysepal eryngo)

spinosepalum
Endemic flora of California
Flora of the Sierra Nevada (United States)
San Joaquin Valley
Taxa named by Mildred Esther Mathias